Colin Dell (born 25 May 1952) is  a former Australian rules footballer who played with Footscray in the Victorian Football League (VFL).	

After leaving Footscray in 1977, Dell played two seasons with Brunswick in the VFA.

Notes

External links 
		

Living people
1952 births
Australian rules footballers from Victoria (Australia)
Western Bulldogs players
Brunswick Football Club players